Fender Contemporary Stratocaster electric guitars were produced by Fender Japan in the 1980s.

General features 
 “D” profile neck with a 12" radius.
 "Single action" or "BiFlex" truss rod adjustment on the headstock.
 Microtilt neck angle fine adjustment.
 Some models have string trees.
 Some models have a coil split switch.
 22 medium jumbo frets.
 Fender Roto-matic tuners, and 4 bolt neck plate.
 11 screw pickguard. Some models don't have a pickguard.
 String locking.
 Fender Schaller System I, System II, System III tremolo systems. Some are fitted with Kahler   2500/2520
 Various combinations of single coil and or humbucking pickups on various models.
 25.5" scale length except model 27-5500 which has a 24.75" scale length.
 Some models feature black coloured necks and/or black coloured headstocks#
 Vast majority of these will have a basswood bodies

All Contemporary models have colored headstocks

Models
 27-5700: 2 single coil and 1 humbucking pickups, 5 position selector switch, coil splitter, 1 volume, 1 TBX, System III tremolo, rosewood fingerboard, 25.5" scale length, side-mounted output jack.
 27-5800: 2 humbucking pickups, 3 position selector switch, coil splitter, 1 volume, 1 TBX, System III tremolo, rosewood fingerboard, 25.5" scale length, side-mounted output jack.
 27-4100: 2 single coil and 1 humbucking pickups, 5 position selector switch, coil splitter, 1 volume, 1 TBX, System II tremolo, rosewood fingerboard, 25.5" scale length, side-mounted output jack.
 27-4200: 2 humbucking pickups, 3 position selector switch, 1 volume, 1 tone, System I tremolo, rosewood fingerboard, 25.5" scale length, side-mounted output jack.
 27-4300: 3 single coil pickups, 5 position selector switch, 1 volume, 2 tones, System I tremolo, rosewood fingerboard, 25.5" scale length, top-mounted output jack.
 27-4302: 3 single coil pickups, 5 position selector switch, 1 volume, 2 tones, System I tremolo, maple fingerboard, 25.5" scale length, top-mounted output jack.
 27-4400: 1 humbucking pickup, 1 volume, system I tremolo, rosewood fingerboard, 25.5" scale length, side-mounted output jack.
 27-5000: 2 humbucking pickups, 3 position selector switch, coil splitter, 1 volume, 1 TBX, System I tremolo, rosewood fingerboard, 25.5" scale length, side-mounted output jack.
 27-5500: 2 humbucking pickups, 3 position selector switch, coil splitter, 1 volume, 1 TBX, System I tremolo, rosewood fingerboard, 24.75" scale length, side-mounted output jack.
 27-5400: 3 single coil pickups, 5 position selector switch, 1 volume, 2 tones, System I tremolo, rosewood fingerboard, 25.5" scale length, side-mounted output jack.
 Unknown: There is an unknown model number featuring 2 single coil and 1 humbucking pickups, 3 independent toggle switches (2 on/off for the single coils and 1 on/off/on for the humbucker), 1 volume, 1 TBX, System I tremolo, rosewood fingerboard, 24.75" scale length, and side-mounted output jack.
 Unknown: There is an unknown model number featuring 2 single coil and 1 humbucking pickups, 5 position selector switch, 1 volume, 1 TBX, System I tremolo, rosewood fingerboard, 25.5" scale length, and top-mounted output jack.
 Unknown: There is an unknown model number featuring 2 single coil and 1 humbucking pickups, 5 position selector switch, coil splitter, 1 volume, 1 TBX, Kahler fulcrum tremolo licensed by Floyd Rose, rosewood fingerboard, 25.5" scale length, side-mounted output jack. This may be an adaptation of either the 27-5700 or 27-4100 model to maintain production.

History 
The Fender Contemporary models were the first Fender Japan models to be exported as Fender Stratocasters and Telecasters. The previous Fender Japan models exported from Japan were all Fender Squier models. The Fender Contemporary models were manufactured from 1984 to 1987 by FujiGen Gakki and these Stratocasters were designed to be Superstrats (Super Strat) with humbucking pickups and Floyd Rose like tremolos made by Schaller and Kahler. There was a lower priced Fender Contemporary Squier model produced as well. Many of Fender Contemporary Stratocaster and Telecaster models had Fender Japan E serial number prefix at the beginning of their serial numbers but in fact, Fender never produced a line of guitars named the "E series". 

When CBS sold Fender to its current owners in 1984, there was a transitional period from 1984 to 1987 with limited Fender USA production resulting in mostly Fender Japan and leftover USA made guitars being sold. There are also Fender Contemporary Telecaster models with HSS or HH pickup configurations and switches for selecting pickup options. The Fender Contemporary Telecaster models used the same tremolo systems as the Fender Contemporary Stratocaster models. Black Francis used a Fender Contemporary Telecaster in the Pixies and Neal Schon played a Contemporary Stratocaster in the music video for Journey's Separate Ways, also the band's first ever video.

There were also USA Contemporary Stratocasters and Telecasters which were totally different than the original Japanese models in terms of features and construction. These short-lived American-made models were made from 1989 to 1991.

Technical information 

The System I bridge string height is set by adjustable pivot post screws and has no individual string height adjustments but has individual string intonation adjustments and is very much like the Gibson Tune-o-matic bridge in terms of intonation and string height adjustments.
The System I tremolo system uses a behind the nut string locking mechanism.
The System II and System III bridges have individual string height and individual string intonation adjustments.
The System II and III tremolo systems use a height adjustable locking nut.

The System II tremolo system was designed by John Page, Chip Todd and Charlie Gressett.
The System III tremolo system was designed by John Page, Dan Smith, Charlie Gressett and John Carruthers. 
The System I, II and III tremolo systems were manufactured in Germany by Schaller.
Sometimes parts of the tremolo system are lost and one common modification is to make the bridge function as a hardtail by locking the bridge into a non movable position and installing a string tree for the first and second strings so that the strings don't slip out of the nut slots.

The System 1 bridge can be replaced successfully with a Floyd Rose licensed bridge.
The slightly wider pivot screw spacing of the System 1 bridge needs a Floyd Rose licensed bridge design with one pivot screw cutaway that extends to the edge of the bridge allowing the Floyd Rose licensed bridge to mount onto the System 1 pivot screws. This configuration is most common in a "Floyd Rose Gotoh" bridge. Most Floyd Rose bridge designs have two pivot screw cutaways that are limited to the width of the pivot screws, and these will not fit the System 1 pivot screw spacing.

Some models exported to UK were fitted with Kahler Traditional Series tremolos, stamped "Made in the USA", and supplied with the American Precision Metal Works, Inc. set-up instructions and Allen keys.

The pickups used in the Contemporary models were manufactured by Fujigen. All of the pickups used on the Contemporary models have alnico magnets instead of ceramic. The humbucking pickups used in the Contemporary models have a DC resistance which is approximately 7.6 kilohms. The single coil pickups used in the Contemporary models have a DC resistance which is approximately 5.6 kΩ. The Contemporary models that use a TBX tone control use 500 kΩ volume pots and use 0.022 µF tone capacitors.

Serial numbers
The early Fender Japan Contemporary series serial numbers from 1984 to 1987 follow the Fender USA serial number format of E = eighties and the first digit of the serial number representing the year.

For example, E6XXXXX = 1986.

Most of the Fender Japan serial numbers do not follow this format.  Instead, in 1986 several have serial numbers beginning with A, B, C, E or F followed by six numerals,( e.g. AXXXXXX or BXXXXXX ) therefore made in 1984,1985,1986 or 1987.

The Fender USA serial format was used on the Fender Japan guitars that were exported to the USA while Fender was undergoing a transitional period.

Sources 
Fender Contemporary and Standard Series Guitars Manual (Japan)
 1986/1987 tour of Fujigen factory, Rainer Daeschler

External links 
 Contemporary Strat info from John Blackman's Japanese Fender fan site (Archive.org)

Contemporary Stratocaster Japan